George Hopkins (July 3, 1928February 28, 2011) was an American comedian and musician.

Early life
George Hopkins was born July 3, 1928, in Manayunk, Philadelphia, to Ruth and John Hopkins Sr. He was of half Welsh and half Polish ancestry. He was the youngest of five children, three sisters and a brother. When Hopkins was 16 he lied about his age and enlisted in the United States Navy and served in World War II in the Pacific Theatre.

Comedy career
Hopkins’ first professional gig was in 1946 at Jerry's Café in West Philadelphia in the back room of the local bar. Seating capacity was about 60 the band was a blind organ player. He did one show on Friday night and one show on Saturday night; Hopkins was paid $35 for both nights.

Then Mr. Hopkins started to do one-nighters at various venues in Philadelphia, like 24 Club, Palumbo's - a nightclub with a seating capacity of 400 and other nightspots in Philadelphia.

George Hopkins’ first network television appearance was on Arthur Godfrey's Talent Scouts, telecast on a Monday night, which he won. Hopkins recalled, “I thought the female singer, Mary Sullivan was much better than me and she should have won, but the audience picked me.” Then Arthur Godfrey booked Hopkins for his Wednesday night network television show, Arthur Godfrey and His Friends and then he was on his radio show the following morning for two weeks. Hopkins was actually on the telecast when Arthur Godfrey fired Julius La Rosa on the air.

Hopkins' agent Herb Marx in New York booked him into the Village Vanguard, on the bill was Eartha Kitt, Wally Cox, Orson Bean and George Hopkins.

From there he started to work in a lot of New York theaters, The Jefferson 14th Street Theater, theaters in Brooklyn and the Bronx.   Then he appeared at the Palace Theater on 46th and Broadway.

In 1965, Hopkins returned to network television on The Les Crane Show, Omnibus, The Ed Sullivan Show and Chance of a Lifetime w/ Dennis James to name a few.

In 1952 NBC signed Hopkins to a 5-year contract starting out at $2500 a week. The producer who set up the contract was Joe Bigelow.   Hopkins’ first NBC appearance under contract was on a spectacular with Beatrice Lillie, Gordon Jenkins and his orchestra, 23 dancers and was hosted by George Abbott.

Herb Marx had offices across West 57th Street from Carnegie Hall and in Miami Beach, Florida. In December 1952 Marx sent George Hopkins to the Eden-Roc Hotel in Miami Beach where he opened for Billy Daniels. Then he went into the Olympia Theater where he was the comedian who shared billing with Rosemary Clooney and Buddy Rich.  Later he played The Caribe Theater with Tony Martin, The Americana Hotel with Vaughn Monroe, Sans Souci Hotel Miami with Lena Horne and The Nicholas Brothers, Hopkins was the comedian. He also played The Diplomat Hotel in Hollywood, Florida, with Tony Bennett.

Then in 1953 Herb Marx sent him to perform at the Beverly Hills, California, venue, Ye Little Club.

Later Hopkins performed at The Slate Brothers Club on La Cienega Blvd. in Los Angeles.  Then he performed at a string of Playboy clubs starting at the Playboy Club Sunset Blvd club then Playboy Club Chicago then Playboy Club Atlanta, then Playboy Club Miami then back to Playboy Club Arizona, and the Playboy Club New York.

Next Hopkins performed in Las Vegas at the Sahara Hotel in the Casbah Theater. He was booked for a two-week contract but the management held him over for 10 more weeks. Hopkins performed at the Sahara five different times. One of those times he produced, directed and starred in his own show called “Fantasia International” that stayed for 3 months. Another time at the Sahara Hotel he worked with Tony Bennett and Joey Heatherton.

George Hopkins also headlined at The Flamingo Hotel with a 14-piece band. Next was the Desert Inn, in the John Gregory Revue. Then he performed at The Hacienda with his wife Jeanette Hopkins, who played piano and sang.

The critic Richmond Shepard noted that Hopkins was one of only two people whom he had ever seen with the ability to perform a "straight-back fall,” that is, falling backwards while remaining perfectly straight throughout.

Music career
In 1961, he performed for a short time as drummer/stand-up comedian for The Ventures. The Ventures were famous for their signature song "Walk, Don’t Run", which eventually sold over two million copies, along with an unprecedented one million album sales each year from 1961 through 1966.

Later years
Hopkins was diagnosed with untreatable cancer in 1995 at age 69 and was given a year to live. Three years after his cancer diagnosis he lost his sight.

He is a father of four children, Kim Hopkins; actress : The Hollywood Knights, Cheech & Chong's Next Movie, and The Tonight Show, and now following in her fathers footsteps doing stand-up comedy, Leigh Hopkins; hairdresser/ Sportclips Manager and  son John Hopkins; who owns an electrical business and youngest daughter Sonni Harris - radio personality. George also has 5 grandchildren, Cary Adams - Corporal Marine and former Fast co. Anti Terrorism Task Force- returned Iraq Veteran, - also  one of which is also a comedic actor, Zack Hopkins  who was a series regular with Harry Hamlin on the WB show Movie Stars, Jensen Harris, and Elaine Harris.

Death
George Hopkins died February 28, 2011, at his home in Miami, Florida. He was 83.

References

1928 births
2011 deaths
Musicians from Philadelphia
Comedians from Pennsylvania
American people of Welsh descent
American people of Polish descent
American male comedians
American drummers
United States Navy sailors
United States Navy personnel of World War II
Child soldiers in World War II
American blind people